The 2021–22 World Rugby Women's Sevens Series was the ninth edition of the global circuit for women's national rugby sevens teams, organised by World Rugby. The ninth edition was meant to be played a year earlier, but the 2021 Series was cancelled due to impacts of the COVID-19 pandemic. 

Australia won the series at the second-last event in Canada, winning four out of the six events on the tour to claim their third World Series title. France, Fiji and  Ireland placed second, third and fourth, respectively, which was the best finish achieved by all three teams in the World Series.  

The 2021–22 series was affected by ongoing impacts of the COVID-19 pandemic, with two of the eleven core teams not able to compete in all six events as a result. The defending series champions New Zealand missed the first four events due to travel-related restrictions, and Fiji was forced to withdraw from both tournaments in Spain due to positive COVID-19 tests in their squad.

A further two core teams also only played in four of the six events. England was replaced by a united Great Britain team for the first two tournaments in Dubai, and Russia was banned from competing following the Russian invasion of Ukraine.

Core teams
Due to impacts of the COVID-19 pandemic, the core teams were unchanged from the shortened 2019–20 series and cancelled 2021 season. The eleven core teams qualified to participate in all events for 2021–22 were:

 
 
 
 
 
 
 
 
 
 
 

Notes

Tour venues
The schedule for the series was:

Standings

Due to the impacts of the COVID-19 pandemic, World Rugby revised the method used for the series standings in the interest of fairness to teams not able to participate in all rounds of the 2021–22 season. This system excluded the two lowest-scored rounds from each team in the final standings. So, with six tournaments in the series, only the best four tournament results for each team contributed to the ranking points.

The points awarded to teams at each event, as well as the overall season totals, are shown in the table below. Points for the event winners are indicated in bold. An asterisk (*) indicates a tied placing. An obelisk (†) is recorded in the event column where a low-scoring round is excluded from a core team's ranking points. A dash (—) is recorded in the event column if a team did not compete at a tournament.

Source: World Rugby

{| class="wikitable" style="font-size:92%;"
|-
!colspan=2| Legend 
|-
|No colour  
|Core team in 2021–22 and re-qualified as a core team for the following season
|-
|bgcolor=#BBBBBB|Black
|Banned from participating in the 2021–22 series from 28 February 2022 onwards 
|-
|bgcolor=#ffc|Yellow
|Invited team
|}  
Notes

Placings summary
Tallies of top four tournament placings during the 2021–22 series, by team:

Statistics

Points

Updated: 22 May 2022

Performance

Key: T = Tackles (1 pt), B = Line breaks (3 pts), O = Offloads (2 pts), C = Carries (1 pt)

Updated: 22 May 2022

Tournaments

Dubai I

Dubai II

Malaga

Seville

Langford

Toulouse

See also
 2021–22 World Rugby Sevens Series (for men's teams)
 Rugby sevens at the 2020 Summer Olympics (held in 2021)

References

External links
Official site

 
World Rugby Women's Sevens Series